A Midnight Bell is a play written by Charles H. Hoyt. It was featured on Broadway in 1889 and starred Maude Adams. The play was adapted into an American silent film in 1921.

References

A Midnight Bell at the Internet Broadway Database

American plays
1889 plays
Broadway plays